Marco Guida (born 7 June 1981) is an Italian football referee who officiates in Serie A. He has been a FIFA referee since 2014, and is ranked as a UEFA first category referee.

Refereeing career
In 2010, Guida began officiating in Serie A. His first match as referee was on 31 January 2010 between ChievoVerona and Bologna. In 2014, he was put on the FIFA referees list. His first senior continental club fixture as referee was on 17 July 2014, a match between Bulgarian club Botev Plovdiv and Austrian club St. Pölten in the UEFA Europa League second qualifying round. He officiated his first senior international match on 4 September 2014 between Croatia and Cyprus. He also officiated in the Chinese Super League in 2018.

References

External links
 Profile at WorldFootball.net
 Profile at EU-Football.info

1981 births
Living people
People from Pompei
Italian football referees
Sportspeople from the Province of Naples